The badminton men's team tournament at the 2002 Asian Games in Busan took place from 6 November to 8 November at Gangseo Gymnasium.

Schedule
All times are Korea Standard Time (UTC+09:00)

Results

Quarterfinals

Semifinals

Final

Non-participating athletes

References
 2002 Asian Games Official Website
2002 Asian Games Official Report, Pages 264–266

Men's team